Utania racemosa is a species of flowering plant in the family Gentianaceae. It occurs in Southeast Asia from Sumatera in Indonesia to the Andaman Islands in India. Its wood is used for timber and fuel.

Description 
The tree is a shrub or small that grows usually 3-6m tall, but sometimes as tall as 15 m tall. The trunk measures up to 18 cm in diameter, with smooth to slightly flaky or fissured bark. The leaves are elliptic and ovate or lanceolate, they grow as small as 6 cm–30 cm long and 4–20 cm wide. Its surface is dark green, glossy and leathery.

The tree flowers from ends of crowded branched spikes 6–14 cm long growing under the leaves. Each flower has cream-white petals 2 cm wide. In northeastern Thailand's Bung Khong Long Non-Hunting Area (Bueng Khong Long District), flowers occur from April to June.

The fruit is oval and has a beaked apex 7–15 mm long and 8–11 mm in diameter, it almost similar to a coffee berry. It has a smooth skin. When mature, its size is 

Features that distinguish this species from other Utania are: rachis in distal half of flower-bearing part of inflorescence and infructescence noticeably thicker than proximal rachis and peduncle; above basal 1–2 tiers, flowering and fruiting tiers usually close-spaced, without clearly visible rachis lengths between tiers; lobes of calyx clasp tightly corolla or fruit base in dried specimens.

Distribution 
The tree is found from Sumatera in Indonesia to Peninsular Malaysia, Thailand, Cambodia, Vietnam, Laos, Myanmar and the Andaman Islands.

Habitat
The plant grows in seasonal forest and tropical evergreen lowland rainforest, including secondary forest. In Cambodia described as growing in dense forests on sandy or on clay soils at elevations of between 0-2000m. In the unusual evergreen freshwater swamp forests known as choam in Khmer, occurring in Stung Treng Province, northeast Cambodia, Utania racemosa occurs as a rare understorey tree in permanently and seasonally inundated areas.

Vernacular names 
In Khmer, the plant is known by a variety of names: prôhu:t tük; tatraw tük; and häng tük, and changka trong.

In Malay, it is known as sepuleh meaning "restorer". It is also called kopi hutan meaning "forest coffee" because of the shape of its fruits.

Uses 
The wood of the Utania racemosa is used for construction and as firewood in Cambodia. In Thailand the wood is also used for construction, but the trunk is also used to make chopping-blocks and the flowers are used to worship images of Buddha and offer to monks.

Malay people make a special drink from its leaves to treat fevers and rheumatism.

History 
M. Suguraman, botanist in Malaysia, transferred this species to Utania in the journal Plant Ecology and Evolution (147(2): 220) in 2014. Suguraman and K.M. Wong (botanist from Singapore) have worked extensively on Gentianaceae.

Further reading 
Additional information can be found in the following:
Hassler, M. 2017. Utania racemosa. World Plants: Synonymic Checklists of the Vascular Plants of the World. In: Roskovh, Y., Abucay, L., Orrell, T., Nicolson, D., Bailly, N., Kirk, P., Bourgoin, T., DeWalt, R.E., Decock, W., De Wever, A., Nieukerken, E. van, Zarucchi, J. & Penev, L., eds. 2017. Species 2000 & ITIS Catalogue of Life
Middleton, J.D. (ed.) (2019). Flora of Singapore 13: 1–654. Singapore Botanic Gardens.
Pandey, R.P. (2009). Floristic diversity of Ferrargunj forest area in South Andaman Journal of Economic and Taxonomic Botany 33: 747-768.
Sugumaran, M. & Wong, K.M. 2014. Studies in Malesian Gentianaceae, VI. A revision of Utania in the Malay Peninsula with two new species. Plant Ecology and Evolution 147(2): 213-223
Toyama, H. & al. (2013). Inventory of the woody flora in Permanent plats of Kampong Thom and Kompong Chhnang provinces, Cambodia Acta Phytotaxonomica et Geobotanica 64: 45-105.
Tropicos.org 2017. Utania racemosa. Missouri Botanical Garden

References 

racemosa
Flora of Indo-China
Flora of Sumatra